The Mummy Range (elevation approximately 13,000 ft) is a mountain range in the Rocky Mountains of northern Colorado in the United States. The range is a short subrange of the Front Range located in southwestern Larimer County northwest of the town of Estes Park. The Arapaho name is "nooku-bee3ei-no," which translates to "White Owls."

Prominent peaks in the range include Hagues Peak, Ypsilon Mountain, Mummy Mountain, and Mount Chiquita. These peaks are easily accessible via the Lawn Lake trail leading to "the Saddle" between Hagues Peak and Fairchild Mountain and, on the southwestern end, the Chapin Pass trail from the Fall River road. Some offer reasonably challenging technical routes but all can be ascended by steep hiking and mild scrambling after snow melt.

References

External links

Hiking info and photos of Ypsilon Lake, which sits at the base of Ypsilon Mountain

Mountain ranges of Colorado
Ranges of the Rocky Mountains
Landforms of Larimer County, Colorado
Rocky Mountain National Park